Sriyani may refer to

Sriyani Amarasena, Sri Lankan actress
Sriyani Dhammika Menike, Sri Lankan high jumper
Sriyani Kulawansa, Sri Lankan hurdler
Sriyani Wijewickrama, Sri Lankan politician

Sinhalese feminine given names